The 2011 Hamilton Nationals season was the third for the franchise.  After playing their 2010 season at Lamport Stadium, the Nationals moved their home games to Ron Joyce Stadium for their third season.  They finished third in the league in 2011 with a 7–5 record.  Jeremy Boltus won the Major League Lacrosse Rookie of the Year Award and Brodie Merrill was named Major League Lacrosse Defensive Player of the Year Award for the sixth straight year.

Standings 

W = Wins, L = Losses, PCT = Winning Percentage, GB = Games Back of first place, GF = Goals For, 2ptGF = 2 point Goals For, GA = Goals Against, 2ptGA = 2 point Goals Against

Final

Denver defeated Hamilton twice during the regular season.

Schedule

Playoffs

References

External links

Toronto Nationals Season, 2011
Hamilton Nationals seasons
2011 in Canadian sports